Donald Frederick Collins (November 30, 1925 – March 10, 2018) was an American politician from Maine. Collins, a Republican from Caribou, Aroostook County, served 5 terms in the Maine Legislature between 1970 and 1992. He also served as mayor of Caribou.

In 1970, Collins was elected to the Maine House of Representatives, and served a single term. In 1976, Collins was elected to his first, two-year term in the Maine Senate. Running again in 1986, Collins was re-elected, serving three more terms in the Maine Senate, retiring in 1992 from elected office.

Background and Family
Donald Collins was the father of United States Senator Susan Collins. His brother, Samuel W. Collins Jr., sat on the Maine Supreme Judicial Court from 1988 to 1994 and served in the Maine Senate from 1972 to 1984. He was one of four children in his family and had six children. Collins was born in Caribou, Maine. He served in the United States Army during World War II, receiving a Bronze Star for heroism, and a Purple Heart with an Oak Leaf Cluster, after being wounded twice in the Battle of the Bulge. Collins went to the University of Maine. He worked in the family lumber business, established by his great-great grandfather, Samuel Collins, in 1844.

References

1925 births
2018 deaths
Businesspeople from Maine
University of Maine alumni
Military personnel from Maine
Republican Party members of the Maine House of Representatives
Republican Party Maine state senators
Mayors of places in Maine
People from Caribou, Maine
20th-century American businesspeople
Collins family of Maine
United States Army personnel of World War II
United States Army non-commissioned officers